Michael A. Maturen (born September 9, 1964) is an American political activist best known for his candidacy for president of the United States as the nominee of the American Solidarity Party in the 2016 United States presidential election.

Life and career
Maturen was born in Saginaw, Michigan in 1964 and was adopted into a Catholic family.  He attended Douglas MacArthur High School, attended Central Michigan University where he earned a Bachelor of Science degree in psychology with a minor in journalism, and, in 2002, Maturen graduated from the Minnesota Graduate School of Theology. 

That same year, Maturen was ordained as a priest in the Communion of Evangelical Episcopal Churches (an Evangelical church in the Anglican tradition—though outside of the Anglican Communion), although he eventually returned to the Catholic Church. As of 2016, Maturen worked as a salesperson and part-time magician. He has also served as the District Deputy for the Michigan Jurisdiction of the Knights of Columbus. 

In 2012, he wrote and published a weekly devotional book entitled A New Dawn: Weekly Wisdom From Everyday Life.

Presidential campaign and political positions

Maturen was the presidential nominee for the American Solidarity Party.
Maturen is opposed to abortion and capital punishment. He refers to himself as "WHOLE life...not just anti-abortion".  He supports the Christian democratic concepts of solidarity and subsidiarity.

Ballot status

Electoral votes: 9 (332 with write-ins)

Ballot access: Colorado

Write-in access: Alabama,
Alaska,
California,
Georgia,
Idaho,
Iowa,
Kansas,
Kentucky,
Maryland,
Michigan,
Minnesota, 
Nebraska,
New Hampshire,
New Jersey,
New York,
North Dakota,
Ohio,
Oregon,
Pennsylvania,
Rhode Island,
Texas,
Vermont,
Virginia,
Washington,
Wisconsin

Endorsements
Peter Lawler, Roman Catholic political scientist
Mark P. Shea, Roman Catholic apologist

References

External links
 American Solidarity Party website

1964 births
American Solidarity Party politicians
Converts to Anglicanism from Roman Catholicism
Converts to evangelical Christianity from Roman Catholicism
Living people
Central Michigan University alumni
People from Alcona County, Michigan
Candidates in the 2016 United States presidential election
People from Saginaw, Michigan